Xu Chao (born 5 November 1994) is a Chinese professional racing cyclist. He rode at the 2015 UCI Track Cycling World Championships. He also competed at the 2014 Asian Games and won a silver medal in the team sprint.

References

External links
 

1994 births
Living people
Chinese male cyclists
Place of birth missing (living people)
Asian Games medalists in cycling
Cyclists at the 2014 Asian Games
Cyclists at the 2018 Asian Games
Olympic cyclists of China
Cyclists at the 2016 Summer Olympics
Asian Games gold medalists for China
Asian Games silver medalists for China
Medalists at the 2014 Asian Games
Medalists at the 2018 Asian Games
Cyclists at the 2020 Summer Olympics
20th-century Chinese people
21st-century Chinese people